The following lists events that happened during 1872 in Australia.

Incumbents

Governors
Governors of the Australian colonies:
Governor of New South Wales – Somerset Lowry-Corry, 4th Earl Belmore, then Hercules Robinson, 1st Baron Rosmead
Governor of Queensland – George Phipps, 2nd Marquess of Normanby
Governor of South Australia – Sir James Fergusson, 6th Baronet
Governor of Tasmania – Charles Du Cane
Governor of Victoria – John Manners-Sutton, 3rd Viscount Canterbury
Governor of Western Australia – The Hon. Sir Frederick Weld GCMG.

Premiers
Premiers of the Australian colonies:
Premier of New South Wales – Sir James Martin, until 14 May then Henry Parkes
Premier of Queensland – Arthur Hunter Palmer
Premier of South Australia – Arthur Blyth, until 22 January then Henry Ayers (5th time)
Premier of Tasmania – James Milne Wilson, until 4 November then Frederick Innes
Premier of Victoria – Charles Gavan Duffy, until 10 June then James Francis

Events
 13 February to 28 March – An election is held in New South Wales.
 19 February – The Municipal District of Dubbo is established, following the approval of the Colonial Secretary.
 26 February – The brig Maria is wrecked when it strikes a reef near Cardwell off the coast of Queensland, killing 39 people.
 12 June – A Victorian branch of the Royal Australian Mint opens in Melbourne.
 22 August – The Australian Overland Telegraph Line is completed when two telegraph lines are joined at Frew's Ponds in the Northern Territory (then South Australia).
 24 September – The General Post Office opens in Brisbane, Queensland.
 Sidney Cooke Limited founded.

Sport
 The Quack wins the Melbourne Cup

Births

 1 January – Arthur Manning, New South Wales politician (d. 1947)
 22 February – Shaw Neilson, poet (d. 1942)
 26 February – John Holman, Western Australian politician (d. 1925)
 13 June – Lydia Abell, military nurse, recipient of Royal Red Cross (RRC) (d. 1959)
 20 June – George Carpenter, 5th General of The Salvation Army (d. 1948)
 28 June – John Keating, Tasmanian politician (d. 1940)
 28 September – David Unaipon, inventor and author (d. 1967)
 14 October – John Leckie, Victorian politician (d. 1947)
 Full date unknown:
 Possibly September – Douglas Fry, artist (born in the United Kingdom) (d. 1911)
 Bertha Schroeder, New Zealand Salvation Army officer, social worker, and probation officer (d. 1953)
 Joe Slater, composer and publisher (d. 1926)

Deaths

 4 January – Sir Edward Macarthur, Administrator of Victoria (born and died in the United Kingdom) (b. 1789)
 15 January – John King, explorer (born in Ireland) (b. 1838)
 12 February – George Herbert Rogers, actor (born in the United Kingdom) (b. 1820)
 20 February – Andrew Petrie, architect (born in the United Kingdom) (b. 1798)
 20 March – William Wentworth, New South Wales politician and explorer (born in Norfolk Island) (b. 1790)
 28 April – Louisa Atkinson, writer and botanist (b. 1834)
 19 May – John Baker, 2nd Premier of South Australia (born in the United Kingdom) (b. 1813)
 11 June – John Davies, newspaper proprietor (born in the United Kingdom) (b. 1814)
 31 December – John McKinlay, explorer and grazier (born in the United Kingdom) (b. 1819)
 Unknown – John Dibbs, mariner (born and died in the United Kingdom) (b. 1790)

References

 
Australia
Years of the 19th century in Australia